Kail Piho (born 28 May 1991) is an Estonian Nordic combined skier. He was born in Võru. He competed in the World Cup 2015 season.

He represented Estonia at the FIS Nordic World Ski Championships 2015 in Falun.

References

External links 

 

1991 births
Living people
Estonian male Nordic combined skiers
Sportspeople from Võru